The Assam Public Service Commission (APSC) (Assamese: অসম লোকসেৱা আয়োগ) is a state recruitment agency for recruitment of Group 'A' officers and Group 'B' officers for the Government of Assam and all state government establishments under Government of Assam which also includes state public sector undertakings and state autonomous bodies. It is headquartered at Jawahar Nagar, Khanapara in Guwahati and functions through its own secretariat. It was established on 1 April 1937.  , Shri Bharat Bhushan Dev Choudhury is its current Chairman. 

See also

 List of Public service commissions in India

References 

State agencies of Assam
State public service commissions of India
1937 establishments in India